The Monongahela Connecting Railroad  or Mon Conn is a three-mile industrial railroad line in Pittsburgh, Pennsylvania. It was a subsidiary of the Jones & Laughlin Steel Company and a large portion of its work was for its parent company, though it also serves other industries along the line.

History
The railroad is possibly best known for its Hot Metal Bridge, which was used to carry molten iron across the Monongahela River from J&L's Eliza Furnaces to the Bessemer converters (later, open hearth furnaces) and rolling mills at J&L's South Side facility.

In 1966, the company was involved in construction of the Pittsburgh Tri-Port Terminal, which had been created "to offer prompt movement of products for rail, truck and river delivery," and was slated to be "used to load or unload river barges for transfer to trucks or railroad," and was "intended to reduce truck traffic over city streets."

The railroad was also a dieselization pioneer, buying many early diesel locomotives from Alco, General Electric and other manufacturers.

The railroad is still in existence, but in much reduced form. The Monongahela River bridge has been converted to a two-lane automobile bridge, with the adjacent hot metal bridge converted for bicycles. The bridges are collectively called the Hot Metal Bridge. The railroad serves a few small industrial customers along the north/east (right downstream) bank of the river.

Joseph L. Sorensen was Vice President of the Monongahela Connecting Railroad from 1948 until 1952.

See also 

 Monongahela Railway, not to be confused with the Monongahela Connecting Railroad.

References

External links 
Holth, Nathan and McOmber, Rick, et al. "Hot Metal Street Bridge: Monongahela Connecting Railroad Bridge." Historic Bridges, 2011, 2016 and 2021 (retrieved online January 7, 2023).
Lundsten, Carsten S. "Monongahela Connecting RailRoad," in "Western Pennsylvanian Railroads," February 3, 2008 (retrieved online January 7, 2023).

Defunct Pennsylvania railroads
Switching and terminal railroads
History of Allegheny County, Pennsylvania
Transportation in Pittsburgh